Mnguni is a South African surname. Notable people with the surname include:

Bennett Mnguni (born 1974), South African footballer
Jabulani Mnguni (born 1972), South African footballer
Themba Mnguni (born 1973), South African footballer

Surnames of African origin